The 2015–16 SHL season was the 41st season of the Swedish Hockey League (SHL). The regular season began in September 2015 and ended in March 2016. The playoffs were played in March–April 2016.

Modo Hockey and Karlskrona HK were forced to play in the SHL qualifiers to defend their SHL status. Karlskrona won their series against AIK in five games while Modo lost to Leksands IF over seven games. Therefore, Leksand were promoted to the SHL on the expense of Modo.

Regular season

Standings

Statistics

Scoring leaders 
 
List shows the ten best skaters based on the number of points during the regular season. If two or more skaters are tied (i.e. same number of points, goals and played games), all of the tied skaters are shown.

GP = Games played; G = Goals; A = Assists; Pts = Points; +/– = Plus/minus; PIM = Penalty minutes

Leading goaltenders 
These are the leaders in GAA among goaltenders who played at least 40% of the team's minutes. The table is sorted by GAA, and the criteria for inclusion are bolded.

GP = Games played; TOI = Time on ice (minutes); GA = Goals against; SO = Shutouts; Sv% = Save percentage; GAA = Goals against average

Playoffs 
The top six teams will qualify directly for the quarter-finals, while the four teams ranked 7–10 will play a best-of-three series and battle for the two remaining spots.

Playoff bracket 
In the first round the 7th-ranked team will meet the 10th-ranked team and the 8th-ranked team will meet the 9th-ranked team for a place in the second round. In the second round, the top-ranked team will meet the lowest-ranked winner of the first round, the 2nd-ranked team will face the other winner of the first round, the 3rd-ranked team will face the 6th-ranked team, and the 4th-ranked team will face the 5th-ranked team. In the third round, the highest remaining seed is matched against the lowest remaining seed. In each round the higher-seeded team is awarded home advantage. The first round the meetings are played as best-of-three series and the rest is best-of-seven series that follows an alternating home team format: the higher-seeded team will play at home for games 1 and 3 (plus 5 and 7 if necessary), and the lower-seeded team will be at home for game 2 and 4 (plus 6 if necessary).

Play In Round
The teams ranked 7 and 10, and the teams ranked 8 and 9, respectively, will face each other in a best-of-three series in order to qualify for the quarter-finals. The better-ranked teams in the two series will receive home advantage, i.e. two home games, if necessary. The two winners will take the two remaining quarter-final spots.

(7) Djurgårdens IF vs. (10) Brynäs IF

(8) Örebro HK vs. (9) HV71

Quarter-finals

(1) Skellefteå AIK vs. (9) HV71

(2) Frölunda HC vs. (7) Djurgårdens IF 

 Note: Games 3 and 5 were played at Frölundaborg.

(3) Linköpings HC vs. (6) Växjö Lakers

(4) Luleå HF vs. (5) Färjestad BK

Semi-finals

(1) Skellefteå AIK vs. (6) Växjö Lakers

(2) Frölunda HC vs. (4) Luleå HF

Finals

(1) Skellefteå AIK vs. (2) Frölunda HC 

Games in italics indicate games that will only be played if necessary to determine a winner of the series.

Statistics

Playoff scoring leaders 
List shows the ten best skaters based on the number of points during the playoffs. If two or more skaters are tied (i.e. same number of points, goals and played games), all of the tied skaters are shown. Updated as of April 24, 2016.
 
GP = Games played; G = Goals; A = Assists; Pts = Points; +/– = Plus/minus; PIM = Penalty minutes

Playoff leading goaltenders 
These are the leaders in GAA and save percentage among goaltenders who played at least 40% of the team's minutes. The table is sorted by GAA, and the criteria for inclusion are bolded. Updated as of April 24, 2016.

GP = Games played; TOI = Time on ice (minutes); GA = Goals against; SO = Shutouts; Sv% = Save percentage; GAA = Goals against average

SHL awards

See also 
 List of SHL seasons
 2015 in ice hockey
 2016 in ice hockey

References 

 
2015-16
2015-16